Mathieu Carrière (born 2 August 1950) is a German actor.

Life
Carrière grew up in Berlin and Lübeck; he attended the Jesuit boarding school  in Vannes, France, a school which had previously been attended by the director of Carrière's first major film, Volker Schlöndorff. In 1969, Carrière moved to Paris to study philosophy and continue his acting. Carrière is also a director and a writer and is known to fight for the rights of fathers. His sister Mareike Carrière was also an actress.

After playing the young Tonio at the age of 13 in Rolf Thiele's 1964 film Tonio Kröger, he played a main part in the 1966 German movie Der junge Törless (Young Törless). In 1980, he was a member of the jury at the 30th Berlin International Film Festival.

Selected filmography

Tonio Kröger (1964), as Tonio Kröger as a Boy
Young Törless (1966), as Thomas Törless
Gates to Paradise (1968), as Alexis Melissen
 (1969), as Lorenzo
 (1970), as Carl-Stéphane Kursdedt
 (1971), as Karl
Rendezvous at Bray (1971), as Julien Eschenbach
Malpertuis (1971), as Jan
Man with the Transplanted Brain (1971), as Franz Eckerman
Bluebeard (1972), as The Violinist
Don Juan, or If Don Juan Were a Woman (1973), as Paul
There's No Smoke Without Fire (1973), as Ulrich Berl
Der Kommissar: Sonderbare Vorfälle im Hause von Professor S. (1973, TV series episode), as Alfred Steger
Giordano Bruno (1973), as Orsini
Charlotte (1974), as Eric von Schellenberg
Serious as Pleasure (1975), as a young man (uncredited)
Isabelle and Lust (1975), as Luc
Parapsycho – Spectrum of Fear (1975)
India Song (1975), as L'attaché d'ambassade allemand
Vortex (1976), as Tauling
Naked Massacre (1976), as Cain Adamson
Police Python 357 (1976), as L'inspecteur Ménard
Le Jeu du solitaire (1976), as Guy
Derrick: Das Bordfest (1976, TV series episode), as Walter Solms
 (1976), as Partner
Coup de Grâce (1976), as Volkmar
Le Jeune Homme et le Lion (1976, TV film), as Roland
Bilitis (1977), as Nikias
The Indians Are Still Far Away (1977), as Matthias
 (1978, TV series, 13 episodes), as Karl Siebrecht
Pareil pas pareil (1978), as Ludwig II of Bavaria
Derrick: Der L-Faktor (1979, TV series episode), as Heinz Bruhn
 (1979)
Woman Between Wolf and Dog (1979), as German Soldier
The Associate (1979), as Louis
 (1979)
Beware of Pity (1979, TV film), as Lt. Anton Hofmiller
Justocoeur (1980), as Doctor
Egon Schiele – Exzess und Bestrafung (1980), as Egon Schiele
The Aviator's Wife (1981), as Christian
Derrick: Eine ganz alte Geschichte (1981, TV series episode), as Arne Reuter
Anima – Symphonie phantastique (1981), as Bachelor
Dantons Tod (1981, TV film), as Saint-Just
 (1981, TV film), as Psychiater
Die Laurents (1981, TV series), as Frédéric Laurent
La Passante du Sans-Souci (1982), as Ruppert von Leggaert / Federico Logo
The Old Fox: Der Tote im Wagen (1983, TV series episode), as John Malven
A Woman in Flames (1983), as Chris
Benvenuta (1983), as François
The Old Fox: Perfektes Geständnis (1984, TV series episode), as Jochen Holmer
 (1984), as Obersturmführer Knoch
The Bay Boy (1984), as Father Chaisson
 (1984), as Thomas Schmidt
 (1984, TV series), as Claus Korff
Le Dernier Civil (1984, TV film), as Lt. Träger
The Future of Emily (1984), as Friedrich (voice)
Yerma (1984), as Víctor
Abschied in Berlin (1985), as Fischhändler
L'Amour en douce (1985), as Carl
 (1985), as Reiter
 (1985), as Archduke Rodolphe
 (1985), as von Bleicher
Spenser: When Silence Speaks (1986, TV series episode), as du Pré
Terminus (1987), as Doctor (voice)
 (1987), as Eduard Strauss
Love Rites (1987), as Hugo Arnold
Derrick: Mordträume (1988, TV series episode), as Max Binder
The Abyss (1988), as Pierre de Hamaere
Sanguines (1988), as Johann
El placer de matar (1988), as Andrés
Francesco (1989), as Man in the Lateran Palace (uncredited)
Fool's Mate (1989, also directed)
Quantum Leap: Honeymoon Express (1989, TV series episode), as Roget
Una ombra en el jardí (1989), as Luis
The Betrothed (1989, TV miniseries), as Count Attilio
Rock Hudson (1990, TV film), as French Doctor
 (1990), as Oskar
Hungarian Requiem (1990), as Örnagy
Aschenglut (1990)
Malina (1991), as Malina
Success (1991), as Erich Bornhaak
Manila (1991), as Carlos
Cómo levantar 1000 kilos (1991), as Schneider
Shining Through (1992), as Von Haefler
Christopher Columbus: The Discovery (1992), as King John
Un placer indescriptible (1992), as Vivaldi
Die Zeit danach (1992)
Schloß Hohenstein (1992–1995, TV series, 13 episodes), as Count Gregor von Hohenstein
Eurocops: Flamingo (1993, TV series episode), as Dr. Bosch
Oh God, Women Are So Loving (1994), as Daniel
Nur eine kleine Affäre (1994, TV miniseries), as Victor
Die Kommissarin: Schatten der Vergangenheit (1994, TV series episode), as Erich Markwald
L'amour conjugal (1995), as Anchire
Tödliche Liebe (1995)
: Mordpoker (1995, TV series episode), as H.C.
Tatort: Bei Auftritt Mord (1996, TV series episode), as Lewald
Doppelter Einsatz: Wunder auf Bestellung (1996, TV series episode), as Kinzel
A Girl Called Rosemary (1996, TV film), as Fribert
Desert of Fire (1997, TV miniseries), as François Legrand
Tatort: Manila (1998, TV series episode), as Wehling
El far (1998), as Mike
Wer liebt, dem wachsen Flügel (1999), as Michael
The Old Fox: Die Wahrheit ist der Tod (1999, TV series episode), as Stefan Achatz
Küstenwache: Das letzte Ufer (2000, TV series episode), as Fabian Keusch
Inspector Rex: The Full Moon Murderer (2000, TV series episode), as Prof. Paul Mandl
Ternitz, Tennessee (2000), as Plastic surgeon
Judas (2001, TV film), as Pontius Pilate
Thomas (2001, TV film), as Pontius Pilate
Utta Danella: Die Hochzeit auf dem Lande (2002, TV series episode), as Arndt Graf Solm-Weltingen
High Speed (2002), as Lucas
Regarde-moi (2002), as Pierre
Ein Fall für zwei: Erics Tod (2003, TV series episode), as Armin Steiner
Luther (2003), as Cardinal Cajetan
The Ride (2003), as Lucas
Hans Christian Andersen: My Life as a Fairytale (2003, TV film), as Otto
Tears of Kali (2004), as Edgar Cornelsen (segment "Kali")
Der Ermittler: Schönheitsfehler (2004, TV series episode), as Dr. Schönemann
Arsène Lupin (2004), as Le duc d'Orléans
The Clan (2005)
Pfarrer Braun: Adel vernichtet (2005, TV series episode), as Baron Friedrich von Falkenberg
Die Rosenheim-Cops: Mord im Paradies (2005, TV series episode), as Ferdinand Buxner
Your Name Is Justine (2005), as Gunter
Du bist nicht allein (2007), as Regisseur
Les murs porteurs (2007), as André
The Fakir of Venice (2008), as Massimo
Die Entbehrlichen (2009), as Gerhardt Rott
Alarm für Cobra 11: Bounty on Kim Krüger (2010, TV series episode), as Rolf Reinhardt
 (2010), as Capitaine
 (2010), as Robert Masse
Slave (2012)
Der letzte Bulle: Es lebe der Sport (2012, TV series episode), as Henri Durand
Leipzig Homicide: Stilbruch (2012, TV series episode), as Harry Reich
The Mark of the Angels – Miserere (2013), as Peter Hansen
The Tunnel (2013, TV series), as Alain Joubert
Frei (2014), as Vollmann
Auf das Leben! (2014), as Knoch / Hannes Frisch
Look 4 Them (2014), as Gallery Owner
Rhein-Lahn Krimi: Jammertal (2017), as Siegfried Brecht
Vollmond (2017), as Hermann Zuber
Joyce (2019)
Breakdown Forest - Reise in den Abgrund (2019), as Der Billionär

References

External links

 Home page 

1950 births
Living people
German male film actors
German male television actors
20th-century German male actors
21st-century German male actors
German people of French descent
Film directors from Berlin
Ich bin ein Star – Holt mich hier raus! participants